Moudania (Moudaniá) may refer to:

Moudania, the Greek name of Mudanya, a town in Asia Minor, Turkey
Moudania (former municipality), a municipal unit in Chalkidiki, Greece, named after Mudanya 
Nea Moudania, a town in Chalkidiki, Greece